Edward Manqele (born 16 June 1987) is a South African football (soccer) striker.

Personal
He hails from Mohlakeng near Randfontein. His name is also sometimes spelled (incorrectly) as "Mnqele" owing to an error on his passport. He has explained: "My name is Jabulani Edward Manqele, but Home Affairs made a mistake when I got my ID … they omitted the ‘A’ in my surname. As a result, in my passport my surname is ‘Mnqele’, which is wrong."

Club career
Manqele was signed by Free State Stars from Vodacom League side Trabzon FC in 2011. He scored 11 league goals in his first season with Stars and became the transfer target of several of the top PSL sides, among them Kaizer Chiefs and Orlando Pirates.

On 22 June 2012, Manqele joined Mamelodi Sundowns on a five-year deal.

Manqele joined Moroka Swallows on a one-year loan, in August 2013.

International career
As a result of his performances in the league, he won his first international cap for Bafana Bafana team in a friendly match against Senegal on 29 February 2012.

References

External links 

1987 births
Association football forwards
Living people
South African soccer players
South Africa international soccer players
People from Randfontein
South African Premier Division players
National First Division players
Free State Stars F.C. players
Mamelodi Sundowns F.C. players
Moroka Swallows F.C. players
Chippa United F.C. players
Kaizer Chiefs F.C. players
Real Kings F.C. players
Sportspeople from Gauteng
South Africa A' international soccer players
2011 African Nations Championship players
2014 African Nations Championship players